Klaus Pohl (1 November 1883 – 28 November 1958) was an Austrian stage and film actor.

Selected filmography

 Hannele's Journey to Heaven (1922)
 Spione (1928) - Burton Jason's Assistant (uncredited)
 Under Suspicion (1928) - Otto
 Woman in the Moon (1929) - Professor Georg Manfeldt
 A Student's Song of Heidelberg (1930)
 1000 Worte deutsch (1930) - Friseurgehilfe
 The Emperor's Sweetheart (1931) - Friseur
 Die Faschingsfee (1931) - Pappritz
 The Wrong Husband (1931)
 M (1931) - Witness / One-Eyed Man (uncredited)
 The Squeaker (1931) - Ein Spieler
 A Mad Idea (1932) - Schneider
 The First Right of the Child (1932)
 The White Demon (1932) - Theaterdiener
 Sacred Waters (1932)
 Das Abenteuer der Thea Roland (1932)
 The Testament of Dr. Mabuse (1933) - Müller
 Die Fahrt ins Grüne (1933) - Ein Agent
 Johannisnacht (1933) - Regisseur
 Du sollst nicht begehren... (1933) - Der Händler-Thomas
 Elisabeth and the Fool (1934) - Clown August
 Hanneles Himmelfahrt (1934) - Schneider
 Music in the Blood (1934)
 Master of the World (1934) - Stöppke, Bergmann
 The Young Baron Neuhaus (1934)
 Herr Kobin geht auf Abenteuer (1934)
 La Paloma. Ein Lied der Kameradschaft (1934)
  (1934)
 The Eternal Dream (1934) - Balmats Vater
 Die Liebe und die erste Eisenbahn (1934)
 Ein Kind, ein Hund, ein Vagabund (1934)
 Love, Death and the Devil (1934)
 Die törichte Jungfrau (1935)
 The Gypsy Baron (1935)
 Rêve éternel (1935) - Le père de Balmat
 Make Me Happy (1935) - Kameramann
 Stradivárius (1935)
 Das Einmaleins der Liebe (1935)
 Liebesleute (1935) - Der alte Raschke
 Artist Love (1935) - Ballettmeister
 The Girl from the Marsh Croft (1935) - Schöffe
 Königstiger (1935)
  (1935)
 Black Roses (1935) - Polizeiagent
 Die lustigen Weiber (1936) - Wächter am Stadttor u. Nachtwächter
 Der schüchterne Casanova (1936)
 Family Parade (1936) - Graf Donnerschlag auf Riesenfels
 Boccaccio (1936) - Empörter Bürger Ferraras
 Uncle Bräsig (1936) - Nachtwächter
 Ninety Minute Stopover (1936) - Ein Sekretär
 Geheimnis eines alten Hauses (1936)
 Die Leute mit dem Sonnenstich (1936) - Kröglmayer - Gefängniswärter in Diggenberg
 Thunder, Lightning and Sunshine (1936)
 Vier Mädel und ein Mann (1936)
 The Hound of the Baskervilles (1937) - Notar
 A Girl from the Chorus (1937) - Inspizient
 Togger (1937) - Der Vormann der Druckereisetzer
 Madame Bovary (1937) - Gerichtsbeamter
 Such Great Foolishness (1937)
 Meiseken (1937) - Hämmerleins Abteilungsdirektor
 To New Shores (1937) - Puritaner
 Heimweh (1937) - Ein kranker illegaler Einwanderer
 The Irresistible Man (1937) - Reporter
 Diamonds (1937) - Inspizient
 Ein Volksfeind (1937) - Teilnehmer bei der Versammlung Dr. Stockmanns
 Der Lachdoktor (1937)
 Strong Hearts in the Storm (1937)
 An Enemy of the People (1937)
 Urlaub auf Ehrenwort (1938) - Ein Artist in der Pension (uncredited)
 The Indian Tomb (1938) - Inder, der beim Fest nach den Gewehren fragt
 Die Umwege des schönen Karl (1938)
 The Stars Shine (1938)
 The Secret Lie (1938) - Bildberichterstatter
 Grossalarm (1938)
 Frühlingsluft (1938)
 The Impossible Mister Pitt (1938) - Parker, Matrose
 The Great and the Little Love (1938) - Ein besorgter Flugpassagier
 Skandal um den Hahn (1938)
 Fortsetzung folgt (1938) - Tetrazzini
 Zwei Frauen (1938)
 Nanon (1938)
 Men Are That Way (1939) - Karusselbesitzer
 Menschen vom Varieté (1939) - Varietéarzt
 The Governor (1939) - Mann am Bahnhof, der sich eine Zigarette anzündet
 Die Geliebte (1939) - Taxifahrer
 Renate in the Quartet (1939)
 Robert Koch (1939) - Wissenschaftler im Pathologischen Institu
 Die fremde Frau (1939)
 Madame Butterfly (1939) - Der Schwerhörige
 Roman eines Arztes (1939)
 Twelve Minutes After Midnight (1939) - Gauner Collin
 Kennwort Machin (1939) - Schreibstengel
 Alarm at Station III (1939) - Lagerverwalter der Allgemeinen Brennstoff A.G. (uncredited)
 Shoulder Arms (1939)
 Maria Ilona (1939) - Sternengucker
 We Danced Around the World (1939) - Agent in Kopenhagen
 Rote Mühle (1940)
 Angelika (1940)
 Weißer Flieder (1940) - Dr. Jensen, Arzt
 The Fire Devil (1940) - Kranewitter, Kärntner Bauer
 Tip auf Amalia (1940)
 The Girl at the Reception (1940)
 Meine Tochter tut das nicht (1940)
 Die Rothschilds (1940) - (uncredited)
 The Three Codonas (1940) - Gnomenhaftes Männchen
 Achtung! Feind hört mit! (1940) - Buchhändler
 Kleider machen Leute (1940)
 Die lustigen Vagabunden (1940)
 Der Herr im Haus (1940) - Granseder
 Ritorno (1940)
 Das Fräulein von Barnhelm (1940)
 Traummusik (1940)
 The Girl from Barnhelm (1940)
 Counterfeiters (1940) - Straßenzeitungsverkäufer
 Kora Terry (1940) - Konzertbesucher
 Bismarck (1940) - (uncredited)
 Operetta (1940)
 Der Kleinstadtpoet (1940) - Vorstand der Friseurinnung von Schönbach
 Frieder und Catherlieschen (1940)
 Blutsbrüderschaft (1941) - Zeitungshändler
 Am Abend auf der Heide (1941)
 Riding for Germany (1941) - Gerichtsvollzieher
 Goodbye, Franziska (1941) - Briefträger Pröckl
 Clarissa (1941) - Bankbuchhalter Huhn
 Sechs Tage Heimaturlaub (1941)
 Leichte Muse (1941)
 Das tapfere Schneiderlein (1941) - Finanzrat
 Der Meineidbauer (1941)
 Tanz mit dem Kaiser (1941)
 Wenn du noch eine Heimat hast (1942) - Fährmann
 Viel Lärm um Nixi (1942)
 Sky Hounds (1942) - Lagerkoch
 Anuschka (1942)
 Die heimlichen Bräute (1942) - Kanzleisekretär Böckl
 Vom Schicksal verweht (1942)
 Andreas Schlüter (1942) - Ein Kommissionsmitglied
 We Make Music (1942) - Bühnenportier in der Oper
 With the Eyes of a Woman (1942) - Theaterinspizient
 Beloved World (1942) - Bürovorsteher Dohle
 Diesel (1942) - Büroangestellter bei Buz (uncredited)
 Ein Walzer mit dir (1943) - Der Sekretär im Furioso-Verlag
 Paracelsus (1943)
 Kohlhiesel's Daughters (1943) - Gemeindediener Paulus
 Karneval der Liebe (1943) - Gardrobier Wichmann
 Liebe, Leidenschaft und Leid (1943)
 Altes Herz wird wieder jung (1943) - Süsswarenverkaüfer am Bahnhof (uncredited)
 Lache Bajazzo (1943) - Mäzen
 Romance in a Minor Key (1943) - Pawnbroker
 Circus Renz (1943) - Stefan - Bärenführer (uncredited)
 Fritze Bollmann wollte angeln (1943) - Lehrer Bockelmann
 Reise in die Vergangenheit (1943) - Portier im Konservatorium
 The Golden Spider (1943) - Der Balettmeister der "Roten Mühle"
 Um neun kommt Harald (1944)
 Love Letters (1944)
 Ein schöner Tag (1944)
 Musik in Salzburg (1944)
 Aufruhr der Herzen (1944) - Krösbacher
 Das war mein Leben (1944) - Schaffner
 Das Hochzeitshotel (1944)
 Spiel mit der Liebe (1944)
 Moselfahrt mit Monika (1944)
 Melusine (1944)
 Der Mann, dem man den Namen stahl (1944) - Der Portier in Stundenhotel
 Via Mala (1945) - Gast bei Bündner
 Am Abend nach der Oper (1945) - Portier
 Under the Bridges (1946) - Museum Employee
 Die Kreuzlschreiber (1950) - Fuhrwerkknecht (uncredited)
 Herzen im Sturm (1951) - Fischer Karsch
 The White Horse Inn (1952) - Bettler Loidl
 The Immortal Vagabond (1953)
 The Sinful Village (1954) - Gemeindediener (uncredited)
 Fireworks (1954) - Piepereit (uncredited)
 The Song of Kaprun (1955)
  (1955) - Winziger
 The Major and the Bulls (1955) - Stockbauer (final film role)

Bibliography
 Eisner, Lotte H. The Haunted Screen: Expressionism in the German Cinema and the Influence of Max Reinhardt. University of California Press, 2008.

External links

1883 births
1958 deaths
Austrian male stage actors
Austrian male film actors
Austrian male silent film actors
Male actors from Vienna
20th-century Austrian male actors